David Louis Edelman is an American novelist and web programmer. He was raised in Orange County, California and graduated from Villa Park High School in 1989.  He majored in Writing Seminars at Johns Hopkins, where he graduated in 1993.

His first book, Infoquake, was nominated for the John W. Campbell Memorial Award for Best Science Fiction Novel  and named Barnes & Noble's Top SF Novel of 2006. In 2008, his second year of eligibility, he was nominated for the John W. Campbell Award for Best New Writer

Over the past ten years, Edelman's programming work has included websites for the U.S. Army and the FBI and teaching software to the U.S. Congress and the World Bank. His work in the dot com boom of the 1990s influenced his first novel Infoquake 

His second novel, MultiReal (a continuation of Infoquake in the trilogy entitled Jump 225), was released in July 2008.  io9, Gawker Media's SF blog, listed MultiReal as one of its top ten books of 2009.

The concluding novel of the Jump 225 trilogy, Geosynchron, was released in February 2010.

Bibliography
 Jump 225 Trilogy
 Infoquake (2008)
 MultiReal (2009)
 Geosynchron (2010)

External links
David Louis Edelman's official Web site

References

21st-century American novelists
American male novelists
American science fiction writers
Living people
1971 births
21st-century American male writers